SESAM / SQL Server is a relational database system originally developed by Siemens, whose role as developer was successively succeeded by Siemens Nixdorf Informationssysteme (SNI),  Fujitsu Siemens Computers, and now Fujitsu Technology Solutions. It runs on the BS2000/OSD mainframe.

Clients running on BS2000/OSD, UNIX systems, Solaris, Linux and Microsoft Windows are supported.

Features
 Support for SQL3
 Data can be stored in EBCDIC and Unicode
 Cost-based optimizer
 Maintenance is possible during operation
 Table partitioning
 Multi-platform support
 Apache web-server integration

References

SESAM/SQL Product Page
SESAM/SQL Presentation

Relational database management systems
Fujitsu software